The Kigluaik Mountains (Kiglawait in Inupiaq) are a  mountain chain running east to west on western Alaska's Seward Peninsula.

This remote range is home to numerous isolated mountain lakes which have been shown to contain unique subspecies of Arctic char. Located in the Nome Census Area, Kigluaik Mountains are noted as the location of Grand Union Glacier, the only remaining active glacier in western Alaska.

References

Landforms of the Seward Peninsula
Mountain ranges of Alaska
Mountains of Unorganized Borough, Alaska